Justin "The Destroyer" Juuko (born 26 December 1972 in Masaka) is a Ugandan amateur light flyweight and professional boxer who was active between the 1990s and the 2010s. 
In 1990, he won a gold medal at the Commonwealth Games in Auckland, New Zealand.

As a professional, he has won the World Boxing Council (WBC) International super featherweight title, the WBC FECARBOX super featherweight title, the African Boxing Union (ABU) light welterweight title, the North American Boxing Federation (NABF) super featherweight title, and the Commonwealth super featherweight title. He was a challenger for the interim WBA super featherweight title against Antonio Hernandez, the WBC super featherweight title against Floyd Mayweather Jr., the International Boxing Association (IBA) super featherweight title against Diego Corrales, the World Boxing Union (WBU) super featherweight title against Michael Gomez, the International Boxing Association (IBA) lightweight title against Rustam Nugaev, and the Global Boxing Union (GBU) light welterweight title against Gábor Vető.

Justin Juuko, son hauteur est de 171 cm et portée est de 183 cm,
il a des records en tant que boxeur amateur et boxeur professionnel.

Life after boxing

He is a member of the political party Forum for Democratic Change (FCD). On December 12, 2020, he was arrested with other people the announcement made by his party FCD which accused the force of order (Police  ) for kidnapping him.  They were missing for 11 days.

Le 01 janvier 2021 Justin Juuko et son collègue M. Garrypaul sont les partisans du FCD parti politique de l'opposition dans la région du Grand Masaka, ils ont été libérés après avoir passés 19 jours au détention, ils étaient arrêtés le 12 décembre par la chefferie du renseignement militaire (CMI)

References

External links

1972 births
African Boxing Union champions
Boxers at the 1990 Commonwealth Games
Commonwealth Games gold medallists for Uganda
Commonwealth Games medallists in boxing
Featherweight boxers
Light-flyweight boxers
Lightweight boxers
Light-welterweight boxers
Living people
People from Central Region, Uganda
Super-featherweight boxers
Welterweight boxers
Ugandan male boxers
Medallists at the 1990 Commonwealth Games